Pushkar Terminus (also referred to as Pushkar railway station) is located in Ajmer district in the Indian state of Rajasthan. It serves the pilgrimage site at Pushkar.

The railway station

History
The 25.7 km Ajmer–Pushkar line (new line from Madar to Pushkar) was completed in 2011 and trains introduced in 2012. The track was approved in 2002 but construction was delayed because of clearances for the line passing through desert and hilly region.

References

External links
 

Railway stations in Ajmer district
Ajmer railway division
Pushkar
Railway terminus in India
2012 establishments in Rajasthan